Moelleriopsis richardi is a species of sea snail, a marine gastropod mollusk unassigned in the superfamily Seguenzioidea.

Description

Distribution
This species occurs in the Atlantic Ocean at bathyal depths off the Azores.

References

 Gofas, S.; Le Renard, J.; Bouchet, P. (2001). Mollusca, in: Costello, M.J. et al. (Ed.) (2001). European register of marine species: a check-list of the marine species in Europe and a bibliography of guides to their identification. Collection Patrimoines Naturels, 50: pp. 180–213

richardi
Gastropods described in 1896